On June 7, 2016, a pickup truck crashed into a group of cyclists in Cooper Township in Kalamazoo County, Michigan. Five cyclists were killed in the crash, and four were injured. Paul Selden, the Director of Road Safety for the Kalamazoo Bicycle Club, called the crash "the worst of its kind in Kalamazoo County, and possibly in the entire state of Michigan".

A permanent memorial installed at Markin Glen County Park was unveiled in a ceremony that took place on June 7, 2018, the two year anniversary of the tragedy. On June 11, 2018, the driver was sentenced to 40 to 75 years in prison on counts of murder, operating under the influence causing death, and operating under the influence causing injury.

Crash and investigation
Witnesses noticed a pickup truck driving erratically around Cooper Township, Michigan. The pickup was reported to the police, 30 minutes before the crash occurred.

Around 6:30 PM (Eastern Time), on Westnedge Avenue near Markin Glen Park in Cooper Township, the pickup collided with the back of the group of cyclists. The group of bicyclists involved in the crash is called the "Chain Gang". The driver of the pickup escaped, but was soon arrested. Rescue services arrived two minutes after the crash.

The five who died were: Debbie Bradley, 53, of Augusta, a mother and a parishioner of St. Ann Catholic Church and a former nurse with Gull Lake Community Schools, Suzanne Joan Sippel, 56, of Augusta, a data manager with the Kellogg Biological Station, a Michigan State University education and research institute, Lorenz John (Larry) Paulik, 74, of Kalamazoo, a grandfather and a dedicated parishioner at St. Thomas More Catholic Student Parish. 
Fred Anton (Tony) Nelson, 73, of Kalamazoo, an active parishioner at St. Thomas More, as well as a grandfather and community member, and Melissa Ann Fevig Hughes, 42, of Augusta.

The National Transportation Safety Board (NTSB) led an investigation of the crash because of its overall impact. On July 29, 2016, the NTSB issued its preliminary report on the event.  They ruled that the driver of the pickup truck "had used medication and illicit drugs before the crash."

Suspect
The suspect in the bicycle crash was Charles Pickett Jr, a 50-year-old man living in Battle Creek, who drove the pickup in the crash. He was arrested for driving under the influence in Tennessee in 2011, but the charge was dismissed.

The Kalamazoo County Prosecutor charged Pickett with five counts of second-degree murder and four counts of reckless driving. The prosecutor later amended the charges to included five counts of operating a vehicle while intoxicated causing death.  The charges were added after the Prosecutors Office reviewed information from the Michigan State Police Crime Lab finished its toxicology report. Blood samples indicated that Pickett was under the influence of methamphetamine, muscle relaxers and pain medication at the time of the crash.

In addition to those charges, the Kalamazoo Prosecutor charged Pickett with four counts of operating while intoxicated causing serious injury, which replace the reckless driving charges he had faced.

In 2018, Charles Pickett Jr. was found guilty on all charges. The jury took only four hours to deliberate. Pickett was sentenced to 40 to 75 years in prison, a total that arose from sentences of 35 to 55 years in prison for each of five counts of murder, served concurrently; 8 to 15 years for each count of operating while under the influence causing death, served consecutively; and 3 to 5 years for each of four counts of operating under the influence causing injury.

Reactions
Residents of Kalamazoo, who were affected by a shooting spree of February 2016, sympathized with the victims of the crash. Cyclist groups also mourned for the families of the 5 victims.

Cyclist Lance Armstrong sympathized with the families of the victims of the crash, and in an interview on Fox 17 (WXMI-TV) he called the crash "so tragic".

References

Road incidents in the United States
2016 road incidents
Kalamazoo County, Michigan
2016 disasters in the United States
2016 in Michigan
June 2016 events in the United States